Leo Styppes, (died January 12, 1143) was Patriarch of Constantinople from 1134 until his death in 1143. He was a presbyter at Hagia Sophia before his ascension. He reigned uneventfully during the rule of Byzantine emperor John II Comnenus.

References

12th-century patriarchs of Constantinople
1143 deaths
Year of birth unknown